Vahid Sheikhveisi (born January 10, 1987) is an Iranian footballer who plays for Arman Gohar Sirjan in the Persian Gulf Pro League.

Club career

References

External links

1987 births
Living people
Iranian footballers
Saipa F.C. players
Fajr Sepasi players
Naft Tehran F.C. players
Paykan F.C. players
Persian Gulf Pro League players
People from Tehran
Association football goalkeepers